Donald Metcalf Grant (April 3, 1927 – August 19, 2009) was an American publisher.

Biography 
He was born in Providence, Rhode Island in 1927 and graduated from the University of Rhode Island in 1949. Grant's interest in fantasy and science fiction started when he began reading the stories of Edgar Rice Burroughs at age 10. He married in 1956 and has two children.

Grant was involved in the founding of several science fiction and fantasy small press publishers. He co-founded Grant-Hadley Enterprises in 1945, The Buffalo Book Company in 1946 and Centaur Press in 1970. He also founded Grandon, Publishers in 1949  (this was after his split from Thomas Hadley; the name was that of a lead character in one of Otis Adelbert Kline's fantasy novels) and Donald M. Grant, Publisher, Inc. in 1964.

Awards
 1976, World Fantasy Special Award: Professional
 1979, Balrog Awards: professional achievement
 1980, World Fantasy Special Award: Professional
 1983, World Fantasy Special Award: Professional
 1984, World Fantasy Convention Award
 2003, World Fantasy Award for Life Achievement.

Notes

References
 
 
 

1927 births
2009 deaths
American book publishers (people)
Businesspeople from Providence, Rhode Island
University of Rhode Island alumni
People from North Port, Florida
20th-century American businesspeople